Basti Bukna (Punjabi,) is a village in Kot Qaisrani Tehsil, Taunsa Sharif District Dera Ghazi Khan, Punjab, Pakistan.

There is a primary school in the village.

References

Villages in Dera Ghazi Khan District